Santirad Weing-in is a Thai professional footballer who played for Muangkan United.

Honours

Club
Buriram United
 Thai League 1 (1): 2015
 Thai FA Cup (1): 2015
 Thai League Cup (1): 2015
 Kor Royal Cup (1): 2015
 Mekong Club Championship (1): 2015

References

External links
News From Goal.com (Thailand) about Transfer of Santirad
Source from Toyota Thai Premier League Official Website

1989 births
Living people
Santirad Weing-in
Santirad Weing-in
Santirad Weing-in
Santirad Weing-in
Santirad Weing-in
Santirad Weing-in
Association football midfielders
Association football defenders
Santirad Weing-in
Expatriate footballers in Cambodia
Thai expatriate sportspeople in Cambodia